The Panamanian National Council on Foreign Relations "Consejo Nacional de Relaciones Exteriores" or CONAREX is a consultation body of the Minister of Foreign Affairs.

The council was created under the Law 28 of 1999 under the government of Ricardo Martinelli of Panama. The members serve pro bono and are appointed by the Executive and convenes tri-annually, or "when is convened extraordinarily". The first council was installed November 19, 2009, when Vice President Juan Carlos Varela, served as foreign minister. 

Foreign Minister Nunez Fabrega said one of the members resigned in 2013 due to the North Korea Ship Seizure but would not name them.

1999- Members
 Rafael E. Bárcenas Perez

2009-2014 Members
 José Miguel Alemán Healy
 Víctor S. Azrak
 Rafael E. Bárcenas Perez
 Navin Bhakta
 Alejandro Blanco
 Aníbal Galindo Navarro
 Emanuel González-Revilla Jurado
 William Liberman (Guillermo)
 Guido J. Martinelli Endara 
 Jurgen Mossack
 Stanley Alberto Motta Cunningham
 Janet Poll Sarlabous
 Nicholas Psychoyos Tagaropulos
 Isabel St. Malo de Alvarado
 Taher Yaafar Chahine
Secretary : Tomás A. Guardia

2014-2016 Members
 Alejandro Blanco
 Alberto Alemán Zubieta
 Alexandra Castro
 Álvaro Tomas
 Anabella de Rubinoff
 Emanuel González Revilla Jurado
 Irene Perurena
 Isaac Btesh
 Janet Poll Sarlabous
 Marcel Salamín
 Joseph E. Harari
 José Miguel Alemán
 Ramón Morales
 Ricardo Alberto Arias
 Sabrina Bacal
 Stanley Motta
 Taher Yaafar

Notable members

Jürgen Mossack served the council from 2009 to 2014. On April 7th, 2016 it was announced that he was resigning after the Panama Papers leak.

References

Organizations based in Panama
Foreign relations of Panama